Statistics of Nemzeti Bajnokság I in the 1933–34 season.

Overview
It was contested by 12 teams, and Ferencvárosi TC won the championship.

League standings

Results

See also
1933–34 Magyar Kupa

References
Hungary - List of final tables (RSSSF)

Nemzeti Bajnokság I seasons
Hun
1